Events from the year 1762 in Denmark.

Incumbents
 Monarch – Frederick V
 Prime minister – Johan Ludvig Holstein-Ledreborg

Events
 10 February - The Guard Hussars regiment is founded.

Undated

Deaths
 3 December – Povl Badstuber, coppersmith and industrialist /born 1685)

References

 
1760s in Denmark
Denmark
Years of the 18th century in Denmark
Denmark